Jeff Weltman is an American basketball executive who is the president of basketball operations for the Orlando Magic of the National Basketball Association (NBA).

In 2020, Weltman received one 1st place vote for NBA Executive of the Year.

Early life and career 
Weltman grew up in New York. He was raised by his father, Harry Weltman, and his mother, Arlene. Harry Weltman was a former GM for the now defunct ABA's Spirits of St. Louis in the mid-1970s and for the Cleveland Cavaliers and New Jersey Nets in the mid-1980s. As a teenager, Weltman played pick-up basketball in the South Bronx and Harlem on Saturdays. Weltman played basketball at Oberlin College in Ohio.

At the start of Weltman's career, he was hired by the Clippers as a video coordinator in the late 1990s. Weltman then served as the director of player personnel with the LA Clippers, director of basketball administration with the Detroit Pistons, assistant GM with the Denver Nuggets and Milwaukee Bucks and EVP of basketball operations and GM with the Toronto Raptors. Before Weltman joined the Raptors, the Raptors were on a five-year playoff-drought. During Weltman's four-year tenure with the Raptors, the team qualified for the postseason every season and won three playoff series.

Orlando Magic 
On April 13, 2017, The Magic fired GM Rob Hennigan and assistant GM Scott Perry following a five-year playoff drought. In the seasons leading up to these events, the Orlando Magic were unfortunate  in the NBA draft lottery and decided to make short-sighted trades with the hope to overcome their postseason losing streak.

On May 22, 2017, the Orlando Magic hired Raptor's GM Jeff Weltman as the new president of basketball operations, and the Orlando Magic announced they would give up their less desirable 2018 second-round NBA draft pick to the Raptors as compensation. Around this time, the Orlando Magic had promising young talent with Aaron Gordon, Elfrid Payton and Nikola Vucevic. In the 2017 NBA Draft, the Magic selected Jonathan Isaac with the 6th pick.

In May 2018, the Magic added new coach Steve Clifford to a four-year deal. Weltman said "Steve is widely regarded throughout the NBA community as an elite coach and developer of players at all stages. His teams have always been disciplined and prepared and have embraced the concept of playing for each other.” In the 2018 NBA Draft, the Magic selected Mohamed Bamba with the 6th pick, and Melvin Frazier with the 35th pick.

Following the 2018–19 Orlando Magic season, Weltman re-signed Nikola Vucevic, Terrence Ross and Michael Carter-Williams and acquired Al-Farouq Aminu. In the 2019 NBA Draft, the Magic selected Chuma Okeke with the 16th pick. In the 2020 NBA Draft, the Magic selected Cole Anthony with the 15th pick.

In 2021, Weltman said the group is confident that Markelle Fultz and Jonathan Isaac will fully recover from their injuries but the current situation is a "toxic brew". Under Weltman's leadership, the Magic moved Nikola Vucevic, Evan Fournier, and Aaron Gordon (who requested a trade) in three separate deals at the 2021 trade deadline, acquiring three future first-round picks, Gary Harris, an expiring contract in Otto Porter, as well as Wendell Carter and R.J. Hampton. With the absence of those veteran players, young talent such as Mohamed Bamba, Chuma Okeke and Dwayne Bacon would be given more minutes to showcase their skills.

Weltman said "Anytime you trade a player like Nikola Vucevic, it is a tough decision to make...Vooch' will go down as one of the best players to ever wear a Magic uniform".

On April 8, 2021, Weltman announced the Magic waived Khem Birch who is an unrestricted free agent following the 2020-21 season. On April 12, 2021, Weltman announced the Magic signed free agent Robert Franks to a 10-day contract. On April 13, 2021, Weltman announced the Magic waived Karim Mané after signing a two-way contract on November 27, 2020. On April 16, 2021, Weltman announced the Magic have signed guard Devin Cannady to a two-way contract.

See also 
List of National Basketball Association team presidents

References

Orlando Magic executives
National Basketball Association executives
Year of birth missing (living people)
Living people